King is an English, Scottish or Irish surname. It is also an Anglicized form of the German surname Küng (also König, Koenig and other forms), which in many German dialects is pronounced like king. This originally German form is widespread among American Mennonites and Amish.

Origins and variants 
The English name may be related to the Old English word for a tribal leader, cyning, which derives from the Proto-Germanic kuningaz.

The Scottish surname "King" is a sept of the Clan Gregor / MacGregor.

King was the 84th most common surname in Ireland according to the 1901 census.

List of people with the surname

Disambiguation of common names with this surname
Alan King (disambiguation)
Albert King (disambiguation)
Andrew or Andy King
Anthony King (disambiguation)
Ben King (disambiguation)
Brandon King (disambiguation)
Catherine King (disambiguation)
Charles (Charlie, or Chuck) King
Chris King (disambiguation)
Daniel (or Dan, Danny) King
David (or Dave, Davey) King
Derek King (disambiguation)
Edward (Ed, or Eddie) King
Eric King (disambiguation)
Evelyn King (disambiguation)
Frank King (disambiguation)
Gary King (disambiguation)
George King (disambiguation)
Harry King (disambiguation)
Helen King (disambiguation)
Henry King (disambiguation)
Howard (or Howie) King
Ian King (disambiguation)
James (Jim, or Jimmy) King
Jack King (disambiguation)
Jason King (disambiguation)
Jeff (or Jeffrey) King
Joe or Joseph King
John (or Johnny) King
Katie King (disambiguation)
Kenneth King (or Ken, Kenny) King
Kevin King (disambiguation)
Larry King (disambiguation)
Leonard (or Len) King
Mark King (disambiguation)
Mary King (disambiguation)
Martin King (disambiguation)
Matthew or Matt King
Mervyn King (disambiguation)
Michael (or Mike) King
Patrick (or Pat) King
Paul King (disambiguation)
Peter (or Pete) King
Philip (or Phil) King
Preston King (disambiguation)
Ray King (disambiguation)
Richard (or Rich) King
Robert (or Bob, Bobby, Rob, Robbie, or Robby) King
Ross King (disambiguation)
Rufus King (disambiguation)
Simon King (disambiguation)
Stephen, Steve or Steven King
Susan King (disambiguation)
Thomas (or Tom) King
Tony King (disambiguation)
William (or Bill, Billy, Will, Willie, Willy) King

Arts and music
Albert King (1923–1992), American blues guitarist and singer-songwriter
Allyn King (1899–1930), American stage and film actress
Amanda King, fictional character in the television series Scarecrow and Mrs. King
Amanda King (filmmaker), Australian filmmaker
B.B. King (1925–2015), American blues guitarist and singer-songwriter
Ben E. King (1938–2015), American singer
Bertie King (1912–1981), Jamaican jazz and mento musician
Betty Jackson King (1928–1994), American musician and composer
Bianca King (born 1985), Filipina actor
Bill King (1927–2005), American radio announcer
Bobby King (1941–1983), American blues guitarist, singer and songwriter
Brett King (1920–1999), American actor and businessman
Carole King, American singer and songwriter
Clydie King (1943–2019), American R&B singer, member of Ray Charles' backing group The Raelettes
Diana King (born 1970), Jamaican singer
Dennis King, actor
Dorothy King (artist), British painter
Earl King (1934–2003), American blues singer-songwriter
Earline Heath King (1913–2011), American sculptor
Emmett King (1865–1953), American actor
Fay King (cartoonist) (1889 – presumed dead), American newspaper cartoonist
Freddie King (1934–1976), American blues guitarist
Georgia King, actress
Hannah T. King (1808–1886), British-American writer
Héctor King, Mexican recording artist
Henry King (1886–1982), American film director
Inge King (1915–2016), German-born Australian sculptor
Jazzy (or Jasmina) King, German-English singer
Jessie Marion King, Scottish painter and illustrator
Jean Paul King, American announcer and actor
Jonathan King, British musician and record producer
Jonathan King (film director), New Zealand film director
Kerry King (born 1964), American rock musician
Mabel King (1932–1999), American film, stage, and television actor
Marcia Gygli King (1931–2011), American artist
Margaret King (painter), 18th-century British artist
Michelle King (born 1958), American TV writer and producer
Mollie King (born 1987), British singer
Pee Wee King (1914–2000), American country music singer
Raj King, a television presenter played by Aatif Nawaz in the British web series Corner Shop Show.
Regina King (born 1971), American actor
Rowena King (born 1970), British actor
Ruby (or Natasha) King, German-English singer
Sidney E. King (1906–2002), American painter
Solomon King (1930–2005), American singer
Tara King, fictional character in The Avengers television series
Teddi King (1929–1977), American jazz and pop vocalist
Wayne King (1901–1985), American musician, singer, songwriter and orchestral leader
Wright King (1923–2018), American actor

Military
Ernest King (1878–1956), US Navy admiral

Politics and government
Adam King (1783–1835), former US Representative from Pennsylvania
Alveda King (born 1951), American politician and minister
Angela King (diplomat) (1938–2007), Jamaican diplomat
Angus King (born 1944), U.S. senator and former Governor of Maine
Bruce King (1924–2009), former governor of New Mexico
Carroll F. King (1924-2010), American politician and businessman
Coretta Scott King (1927-2006), American civil rights leader and widow of Martin Luther King Jr.
Dick King (politician) (1934–2018), American politician
Dwayne A. King (born 1939), American politician
Frederick King (politician) (born 1923), Canadian House of Commons member
Martin Luther King Jr. (1929-1968), American civil rights leader
Owen King (Wisconsin) (1845–1932), American politician and businessman
Ralph E. King (1902–1974), American physician and Louisiana state senator 
Thérèse King (1934–2015), Senegalese politician
Thomas Starr King (1824–1864), American Universalist and Unitarian minister influential in California politics during the American Civil War.
William Lyon Mackenzie King (1874-1950), 10th prime minister of Canada

Sciences
R. Bruce King, American inorganic chemist
Elizabeth Osborne King (1912-1966), American microbiologist
Leonard William King (1869–1919), English archaeologist
Lester Charles King (1907–1989), English geomorphologist

Sports
Adam King (born 1995), Scottish footballer
Alex King (basketball) (born 1985), German basketballer
Barry King (decathlete) (1945–2021), British Olympic decathlete, corporate director and author
Barry King (tennis) (born 1985), Irish tennis player
Bernard King (born 1956), American basketball player
Billie Jean King (born 1943), American tennis player                     
Brandon King (cricketer), Jamaican and West Indies cricket player
Cathy King, Canadian curler
Collis King, former West Indian cricketer
Dana M. King, American college sports coach
Darian King (born 1992), Barbadian tennis player
D'Eriq King (born 1997), American football player
Desmond King (American football) (born 1994), American football player
D. J. King (born 1984), Canadian professional ice hockey player
Dick King (American football) (1895–1930), American football player
Dolly King (1916–1969), American basketball player
Don King (born 1931), American boxing promoter
Don King (born 1960), American surfing photographer
Dwight King (born 1989), Canadian professional ice hockey player
Emmit King (1959–2021), American sprinter
Ernie King (1903–1993), English footballer who played for Southampton
Evan King (born 1992), American tennis player
Fay King (American football) (1922–1983), American football player
Frances King (1980–2003), cricketer from New Zealand
Frederick King (cricketer) (1850–1893), English cricketer
Gayl King, Canadian darts player
Gordon King, American football player
Jim King, American baseball player
John King (baseball), American baseball player
John King (racing driver), American NASCAR driver
John King (rugby league), rugby league footballer of the 1940s
Jordan King, British IndyCar driver
Joshua King (born 1992), Norwegian footballer
Kim King, American college football player
Lamar King (born 1975), American football player
Laurence Eastern "Laurie" King (1908–1992), Australian rules footballer
Ledley King (born 1980), English footballer
Lilly King (born 1997), American swimmer
Louis King (basketball) (born 1999), American basketball player
Marlon King (born 1980), Jamaican footballer
Reggie King (born 1957), American basketball player
Sam King (1911–2003), professional golfer
Savannah King (born 1992), Canadian freestyle swimmer
Shaun King (American football), American football player and sports commentator 
Shawn King (basketball), (born 1982), Saint Vincent and the Grenadines basketball player
Syd King (1873–1933), English footballer and manager
Vania King (born 1989), American tennis player
William Bradley-King (born 1997), American football player
W. J. King (1864–1934), American college football coach

Writing
Florence King (1936–2016), American novelist, essayist and columnist
Frances King (1757-1821), writer and philanthropist
Francis King (1923–2011), British novelist, poet, and short story writer
Georgiana Goddard King (1871–1939), American Hispanist and medievalist
Grace King, American author
Hannah T. King (1808–1886), British-American writer, pioneer
Jessie Margaret King (1862–?), Scottish essayist, journalist, poet
Michelle King (journalist), journalist and women's rights activist
Stephen King, American horror author

Other
Basil King (1859–1928), Canadian clergy and novelist
Beverly Sedgwick King (1876–1935), philatelist of New York City
Ginevra King (1898–1980), American socialite
Jean Ledwith King (born 1924), American activist
Karen Leigh King (born 1954), American academic 
Kelly King (born 1948), American businesswoman
Kenneth King (academic), a historian, an Africanist 
Lida Shaw King (1868–1932), American classicist and college dean
Michelle King (educator) (1961-2019), American educator
Rodney King (1965–2012), American man beaten by Los Angeles police
Ursula King (born 1938) German scholar of religion 
Walter Gawen King (1851-1935), British Indian army physician and public health pioneer
Willford I. King, American statistician and economist

See also
Captain King (disambiguation)

References

Scottish surnames
English-language surnames
Surnames of Irish origin
Surnames from nicknames